The Nigerian Records in Swimming are the fastest times ever swum by a swimmer representing Nigeria. These records are kept/maintained by the Nigeria Aquatics Federation (NAqF).

Records are recognized for the following long course (50m) events:
freestyle: 50, 100, 200, 400, 800 and 1500;
backstroke: 50, 100 and 200;
breaststroke: 50, 100 and 200;
butterfly: 50, 100 and 200;
individual medley (I.M.): 100, 200 and 400;
relays: 4x100 free, 4x200 free, and 4 × 100 medley.

All records were set in finals unless noted otherwise.

Long Course (50m)

Men

|-bgcolor=#DDDDDD
|colspan=9|
|-

|-bgcolor=#DDDDDD
|colspan=9|
|-

|-bgcolor=#DDDDDD
|colspan=9|
|-

|-bgcolor=#DDDDDD
|colspan=9|
|-

|-bgcolor=#DDDDDD
|colspan=9|
|-

Women

|-bgcolor=#DDDDDD
|colspan=9|
|-

|-bgcolor=#DDDDDD
|colspan=9|
|-

|-bgcolor=#DDDDDD
|colspan=9|
|-

|-bgcolor=#DDDDDD
|colspan=9|
|-

|-bgcolor=#DDDDDD
|colspan=9|
|-

Mixed relay

Short Course (25m)

Men

Women
A source is needed to show that Nigeria short course records exist.

References

External links
Swimming in Nigeria

Nigeria
Records
Swimming records
Swimming